Toggenburg may refer to:

 Toggenburg, a region and constituency in the Swiss canton of St. Gallen
 the Counts of Toggenburg, the medieval counts eponymous of the region
 Elisabeth von Toggenburg née von Matsch (1380's — around 1439), last countess of Toggenburg
 Toggenburg (goat), a breed of goat
 Cyre de Toggenburg, a Swiss French painter

It may also refer to:
"Toggenburg Mountain", a ski area in Fabius, New York

See also
 Toggenburg Succession (Old Zurich War, 1440–46)
 Toggenburg war (Second war of Villmergen, 1712)